Abortion doulas provide care before, during, and after an abortion, with support varying by patient and their informational, emotional, physical, and practical needs.

Work 
Abortion doulas provide "nonjudgemental" emotional, physical, informational, and logistical support and care before, during, and after a medical or surgical abortion. Doulas work in a variety of situations, including community collectives and as solo practitioners. They may support the person emotionally and physically as they navigate a line of protesters, talk with them about the choice they've made, hold the person's hand or help with finding funding, accessing childcare, coordinating travel, and scheduling meal deliveries.

Like other doulas, the abortion doula is concerned solely with the patient rather than having other concerns typical for the medical personnel present for an event. Unlike other types of doulas, an abortion doula may interact with a patient only during the patient's abortion and may never interact with that patient again.

Studies show that women overwhelmingly recommend abortion doula support even though there is no measurable effect on pain or satisfaction. Support from a doula is shown to reduce the need for an additional member of the clinic's staff with physicians and staff generally feeling that the presence of a doula improves a patient's experience.

Training and licensure 
Training varies and may include understanding barriers to health care, societal views of abortion, typical patient needs. 

In the United States, as of 2022 there are no certifications specifically for abortion doulas that are administered nationally or through individual states. Because of this, there is no accurate estimate of numbers. In 2019, Bustle estimated there were approximately 30 abortion doula collectives throughout the country.

The work of an abortion doula was developed through the women's health movement in the 1980s where midwifery communities are doula began providing support for childbirth. According to Bustle, the first abortion doula collective was formed in New York City in 2007, as a response to how the culture viewed abortion. Abortion doulas often view their work through a reproductive justice lens that utilizes an intersectional approach.

COVID-19 
Pre-Covid-19, abortion doulas were typically allowed to remain with the patient through the procedure, but during the pandemic safety concerns meant at some clinics the abortion doula could not accompany the patient.

See also 

 Jane Collective

References 

Abortion in the United States